Events from the year 1991 in Kuwait.

Incumbents
Emir: Jaber Al-Ahmad Al-Jaber Al-Sabah
Prime Minister: Saad Al-Salim Al-Sabah

Events
January to March

Gulf War:
 January 16 - Operation Desert Storm (American) began.
 
 February 26 - Saddam Hussein withdrew Iraqi troops from Kuwait.
 February 28 - Ceasefire
April to June

July to September

October to December

Births

 29 September - Abdulaziz Al Salimi.
 9 October - Faisal Zaid.
 10 November - Fahed Al Hajri.

References

 
Kuwait
Kuwait
Years of the 20th century in Kuwait
1990s in Kuwait